The Karry Dolphin is an electric light, commercial 4/5-door van designed and produced by the Chinese automaker Karry since 2019.

Overview

The Karry Dolphin EV was launched at the Vanke International Convention Center in Qianhai, Shenzhen on September 19, 2019. Dolphin EV is an fully electric urban logistics van by Karry, specially designed for the needs of urban logistics and distribution.

Specifications
The Karry Dolphin EV was built on a frame chassis with a permanent magnet synchronous electric motor positioned over the rear axle, with the output of which reaching 82 hp, and 230 Nm of torque. A 44.5 kWh lithium iron phosphate flat battery pack is located right under the floor. The Dolphin EV is capable of covering 271 km on one charge. The powertrain layout of the Dolphin EV is rear-wheel drive, with MacPherson-type independent front suspension and rear-dependent leaf springs. The top speed is 100 km/hr.

Masta EV Van
Korean spec of Dolphin EV. Expected to launch in 2022. It was revealed in 2021 Seoul Mobility Show.

Samsung SDI battery will apply in this car. It can go up to 288km.

References

External links
Official website

Dolphin
Vans
Electric vans
Cars introduced in 2019
2010s cars
2020s cars
Rear-wheel-drive vehicles